Sarbast or Sar Bast may refer to:
 Sarbast, Dashtestan, Bushehr Province
 Sarbast, Ganaveh, Bushehr Province
 Sarbast, Tangestan, Bushehr Province
 Sar Bast, Marvdasht, Fars Province
 Sar Bast, Sepidan, Fars Province